Serdar Üstüner (born March 1, 1983) is a boxer from Turkey.  He boxed for the Turkey in the 2004 Summer Olympics where he was stopped in the first round of the Men's Middleweight (75 kg) division by Uzbekistan's Sherzod Abdurahmonov. He qualified for the Athens Games by ending up in second place at the 3rd AIBA European 2004 Olympic Qualifying Tournament in Gothenburg, Sweden. In the final he lost to Hungary's Károly Balzsay.

References
Sedat Ustuner at Sports Reference

1983 births
Olympic boxers of Turkey
Middleweight boxers
Living people
Boxers at the 2004 Summer Olympics
Turkish male boxers